Abraham Johannes Aloysius Maria "Bram" Bart (April 23, 1962 – April 8, 2012) was a Dutch voice actor.  He dubbed voices in cartoons like Pokémon, Bob the Builder, and Ratz.  Bram Bart died at the age of 49, in the University Hospital Leuven, Belgium.  He was suffering from cancer.

Voices
Bob the Builder (Dutch: Bob de Bouwer) - Bob
The Angry Beavers (Dutch: De Boze Bevers) - Daggett (Dutch: Boris)
Ratz - Raphino
Shin Chan - Mister Enzo, Grandpa
Jetix - Dutch voice
Pokémon - James, Gary Oak
The Powerpuff Girls - Mojo Jojo
Sesamstraat - Baby Bear

Commercials
DRK Kozijnen
Park Bercenrode
Lego City
Smoeltjes

References

1962 births
2012 deaths
Dutch male television actors
Dutch male stage actors
Dutch male voice actors
Deaths from pancreatic cancer
Deaths from cancer in Belgium
People from 's-Hertogenbosch
20th-century Dutch people